Gerry Murphy may refer to:

Gerry Murphy (poet) (born 1952), Irish poet
Gerry Murphy (football manager) (born 1943), former caretaker manager of Huddersfield Town F.C.
Gerry Murphy (rugby union coach), Irish rugby union coach
Gerry Murphy (entrepreneur) (born 1954), Irish entrepreneur, author and activist
Gerry Murphy (weather forecaster) (born 1969), Irish meteorologist

See also
Jerry Murphy (born 1959), former footballer
Gerard Murphy (disambiguation)